Mian Muhammad Hilal Hussain is a retired lieutenant general of the Pakistan Army who is 32nd and current defence secretary of Pakistan. Proceeded by lieutenant general Ikram Ul Haq, he was appointed to the post on 24 August 2020 by the government of Pakistan. Before retiring from the military service, his last assignment included commander of Army Strategic Forces Command.

Military career 
Hussain graduated from the Command and Staff College and the National Defence University, in addition to obtaining his education from Army Command and Staff College.

He was commissioned in the Pakistan Army with posting at an uncertain self-propelled artillery in 1982. He served as a major while stationed at Siachen Glacier. During his career as lieutenant colonel, he was posted at the Line of Control (LoC), and brigade commander for operational areas with additional charges to command western border.

Prior to his appointment as commander of the Army Strategic Force Command in September 2015, he was appointed to I Corps as a general officer commanding after succeeded by Umar Farooq Durrani in October 2015. His instructional assignments includes military advisor to Permanent Representative of Pakistan to the United Nations and military secretary to the president of Pakistan. Before commanding infantry brigade in the Federally Administered Tribal Area (FATA), he served as director general of Pakistan Rangers at Punjab and director general for Military Training at the General Headquarters.

Other works 
In 2017, he was elected president of Pakistan Golf Federation for the term of four years which ended in 2020 before serving as defence secretary.

References 

Living people
Date of birth missing (living people)
Place of birth missing (living people)
Defence Secretaries of Pakistan
Pakistan Army officers
National Defence University, Pakistan alumni
Pakistani generals
Year of birth missing (living people)